Richard E. "Dick" Jacobs (June 16, 1925 – June 5, 2009) was an American businessman and real estate developer who co-founded the Jacobs Entertainment, Richard E. Jacobs Group, and owner of the Cleveland Indians from 1986-1999.

Biography
Jacobs was born in 1925 in Akron, Ohio In 1943, he served in the Army during World War II.  In 1949, he graduated from Indiana University with a degree in business administration and accepted a job with a development company in Akron. In 1955, he and his brother, David H. Jacobs, started a general contracting company that concentrated on the building of small strip malls. The company grew rapidly and by 1992, the Jacobs Group ranked fourth in the nation in the development and management of enclosed malls owning 40 malls in 16 states outright; they also owned 31 Wendy's fast-food restaurants and several Marriott Hotels & Resorts. The Jacobs Group company builds and leases shopping centers, offices, and hotels. Among its properties are Key Tower and Westgate Mall in Cleveland, Ohio, and Triangle Town Center in Raleigh, North Carolina. His company also built Westland Mall, Northland Mall, and Eastland Mall in Columbus, Ohio.

Along with his brother, Jacobs was also well known for owning the Cleveland Indians of Major League Baseball (MLB) from 1986 to 1999. The Jacobs built and opened Jacobs Field in Cleveland, Ohio in 1994. The ballpark bore his family name from its opening in 1994 until early 2008. Jacobs' tenure as Indians owner marked one of the team's most successful periods in franchise history the team went 1119-1080 during the regular season, and 25-22 during the postseason, having reached the World Series on two occasions (1995, and 1997), and winning American League Central Division championships in five consecutive seasons (1995-1999). Under Jacobs ownership the Indians also hosted the 1997 All-Star Game.

Jacobs was a co-owner with his son, Jeffrey Jacobs, of Jacobs Entertainment, a casino and racetrack company after they merged companies in 2002.

Cleveland Clinic's Richard E. Jacobs Health Center in Avon, Ohio bears his name.

Jacobs died on June 5, 2009 after a long illness at his Westlake home. The funeral was held at the Rocky River United Methodist Church. He was buried at Lakewood Park Cemetery in Rocky River, Ohio.

Awards and honors

As Indians owner
Two-time American League Champion  1995, 1997
Five-time American League Central Division Champion (1995, 1996, 1997, 1998, 1999)
Cleveland Indians Hall of Fame (class of 2009)

As a businessman
2009 Downtown Cleveland Alliance Ruth Ratner Miller Award (for his contributions in developing the downtown area - awarded posthumously)

References

External links
 The Richard E. Jacobs Group
 Encyclopedia of Cleveland article about Richard's brother David and the Jacobs Group
 Ocker, Sheldon. "One man's plan leaves a legacy of success". Akron Beacon Journal, 5 June 2009.

1925 births
2009 deaths
American chief executives
American real estate businesspeople
American United Methodists
Major League Baseball executives
Cleveland Indians executives
Cleveland Indians owners
Businesspeople from Cleveland
Burials at Lakewood Park Cemetery
20th-century American businesspeople
20th-century Methodists